The Water Canyon Fire of 1954 was a wildfire in the eastern edge of the Jemez Mountains and the Santa Fe National Forest which burned approximately 3,000 to 6,000 acres (12−24 km²).  The fire started on June 5, 1954, when the burning of trash and construction debris in upper Water Canyon got out of control.  Winds of up to 45 mph (72 km/h) pushed the fire 4 miles (6 km) north before it was contained after several days of work by 1,000 firefighters and a favorable change in wind conditions.  The fire was significant for being the first fire to require the evacuation of nearby Los Alamos, New Mexico.

Although most sources list the Water Canyon Fire as occurring in 1954, one document from Los Alamos County (Multi-Hazard Mitigation Plan) lists the fire with a date of 1953, with the smaller 1,000 acre (4 km²) Burnt Mountain Fire as occurring in 1954.

See also 
 La Mesa Fire (1977)
 Dome Fire (1996)
 Oso Complex Fire (1998)
 Cerro Grande Fire (2000)
 Las Conchas Fire (2011)

Notes

Sources
 Jemez Mountains Fire History
 Multi-Hazard Mitigation Plan
 Fuels Inventories in the Los Alamos National Laboratory Region: 1997

Wildfires in New Mexico
1954 fires in the United States
1954 in New Mexico
1950s wildfires in the United States
Jemez Mountains
Santa Fe National Forest
History of Los Alamos County, New Mexico
1954 natural disasters in the United States